The Chief, Internal Revenue Service, Criminal Investigation, abbreviated as Chief, IRS-CI or Chief, CI or simply Chief, is the head and chief executive of Internal Revenue Service, Criminal Investigation (IRS-CI), the United States' federal law enforcement agency responsible for investigating potential criminal violations of the U.S. Internal Revenue Code and related financial crimes. Criminal Investigation is a division of the Internal Revenue Service, which in turn is a bureau within the United States Department of the Treasury. The Chief is the highest ranking executive within IRS-CI and reports to the Deputy Commissioner for Services and Enforcement of the Internal Revenue Service.

The Chief is appointed by the Commissioner of Internal Revenue and oversees a worldwide staff of approximately 3,300 CI employees, including approximately 2,200 special agents who investigate and assist in the prosecution of criminal tax, money laundering, public corruption, cyber, ID theft, narcotics, terrorist-financing and Bank Secrecy Act related crime cases.

The current Chief is Jim Lee since October 1, 2020. He was the Deputy Chief to former Chief Don Fort, who retired on September 30, 2020 having served in the position since June 2017. Shortly after the announcement of Fort's retirement, the Internal Revenue Service announced that Lee would be the new Chief of the agency.

Powers and duties 
The powers and duties of the Chief are spelled out in the Internal Revenue Manual, Part 1, Chapter 1, Section 19.

(1) The Chief is responsible for the full range of planning, managing, directing, and executing the worldwide activities of CI. The Chief together with the Deputy Chief, directly supervises the Directors of the HQ offices, as well as the Area Directors, Field Operations.

(2) The Office of the Chief includes the following sections:
 Chief of Staff
 Deputy Chief of Staff
 C&E
 EDI
 RPE

(3) The Chief of Staff, together with the Deputy Chief of Staff, manages the Chief and Deputy Chief's official appointments, speaking engagements, calendar items, and duties associated with the selection of senior management personnel. Additionally, the Chief of Staff supervises the Commissioner's Protection Detail which provides daily executive protection to the IRS Commissioner.

(4) Communications and Education plans, coordinates, and produces communications products and tools for CI. Communications and Education provides a wide range of products and services to help achieve communications goals to a variety of audiences; employees, managers, the media, tax, accounting and business professionals, and other external and internal stakeholders. Communications and Education also coordinates field office publicity through the PIOs who are special agents trained in media relations. Communications and Education is also the home to CI's Legislative Liaison who manages and enhances CI's relationship with members of Congress, ensures CI sections are informed of pending legislation affecting their areas, and responds to Congressional inquiries and correspondence.

(5) Equity, Diversity & Inclusion is responsible for identifying trends and issues of an EEO and diversity nature, and potential barriers to equal employment opportunity within CI. Equity, Diversity & Inclusion's responsibilities include educating management and employees on equity, diversity & inclusion, how to resolve complaints and conflict in the workplace, and providing observation on recruitment, outreach, promotion, retention, and leadership initiatives, thereby improving workforce demographics to achieve equal opportunity.

(6) Review and Program Evaluation independently reviews, evaluates, and reports on CI field operations, program areas, and headquarters sections in a fair and objective manner. Review and Program Evaluation identifies risks, emerging issues and best practices which affect CI; assess CI's leadership effectiveness, and ability to manage and mitigate risk; evaluate CI operations to ensure investigative alignment with the Compliance Strategy; and to ensure compliance with established policies and prior TIGTA, GAO, and RPE recommendations.

List of officeholders 
The following is a complete list of officeholders from 1919 to present.

See also 

 Internal Revenue Service, Criminal Investigation
 Director of the Central Intelligence Agency
 Director of the Federal Bureau of Investigation
 Director of the United States Marshals Service
 Director of the United States Secret Service
 Federal law enforcement in the United States

References

External links
Criminal Investigation | Internal Revenue Service
IRS-CI Official Twitter Account

American federal law enforcement officials
Criminal Investigation